Eucalyptus incerata, commonly known as Mount Day mallee, is a species of mallee that is endemic to southern Western Australia. It has smooth bark, lance-shaped adult leaves, flower buds with a long, horn-shaped operculum and arranged in groups of seven, yellow flowers and barrel-shaped to cup-shaped fruit.

Description
It has smooth, light greyish brown bark. Flowering has been seen in October and the flowers are creamy yellow.

Taxonomy and naming
Eucalyptus incerata was first described in 2002 by Ian Brooker and Stephen Hopper from a specimen collected in 1983 near Mount Day, between Hyden and Norseman. The description was published in the journal Nuytsia. The specific epithet (incerata) is from the Latin inceratus, meaning 'covered with wax', referring to the waxy deposit on the branchlets, buds and fruit of this species.

Distribution and habitat
Mount Day mallee is found in mallee scrub among sandplains and on ridges between Hyden, Norseman and Coolgardie, Western Australia in the Avon Wheatbelt, Coolgardie and Mallee biogeographic regions where it grows in yellow sandy lateritic soils.

Conservation status
This mallee is classified as "not threatened" by the Western Australian Government Department of Parks and Wildlife.

See also
List of Eucalyptus species

References

Eucalypts of Western Australia
incerata
Myrtales of Australia
Plants described in 2002
Mallees (habit)
Taxa named by Ian Brooker
Taxa named by Stephen Hopper